Starting Over Again may refer to:

Film
 Starting Over Again (2014 film), a Filipino romantic comedy
 Starting Over Again (2015 film), an Italian documentary

Music
 Starting Over Again (album), a 2008 album by Sheryn Regis
 "Starting Over Again" (Natalie Cole song), recorded by Dionne Warwick, 1981 and Natalie Cole, 1989
 "Starting Over Again" (Donna Summer song), recorded by Dolly Parton, 1980, and Reba McEntire, 1995
 "Starting Over Again" (Steve Wariner song), a 1986 song by Steve Wariner

See also
 Starting All Over Again (disambiguation)